is an underground metro station located in Naka-ku, Yokohama, Kanagawa, Japan operated by the Yokohama Municipal Subway’s Blue Line (Line 1). It is 19.0 kilometers from the terminus of the Blue Line at Shōnandai Station.

History
Isezaki-chōjamachi Station was opened on December 16, 1972. Platform screen doors were installed in September 2007.

Lines
Yokohama Municipal Subway
Blue Line

Station layout
Isezaki-chōjamachi Station is an underground station with a single island platform serving two tracks.

Platforms

References
 Harris, Ken and Clarke, Jackie. Jane's World Railways 2008-2009. Jane's Information Group (2008).

External links
 Isezaki-chōjamachi Station (Blue Line) 

Naka-ku, Yokohama
Railway stations in Kanagawa Prefecture
Railway stations in Japan opened in 1972
Blue Line (Yokohama)